Ryan Flinn (born April 20, 1980) is a Canadian professional former professional ice hockey winger who played with the Los Angeles Kings in the National Hockey League (NHL).

Playing career
Flinn was known as an enforcer. He was drafted in the fifth round, 143rd overall by the New Jersey Devils, in the 1998 NHL Entry Draft. Selected from the QMJHL Flinn accumulated over 200 penalty minutes in each of his four full seasons with the Titans, Halifax Mooseheads and the Cape Breton Screaming Eagles.

Unsigned by the Devils, Flinn began his professional career in the East Coast Hockey League with the Reading Royals. Leading the ECHL in penalty minutes, Flinn was signed to a try-out contract with the Manchester Monarchs of the AHL, before signing with NHL affiliate, the Los Angeles Kings midway through the 2001–02 season and appearing in 10 NHL games. Flinn spent 2002–03 split between the Monarchs and the Kings, scoring his first NHL goal with the Kings.

After missing the majority of the 2004–05 season with the Monarchs due to a foot and leg injury, Flinn returned the following year, only to be lost to a serious concussion suffered against the Chicago Blackhawks on November 26, 2005.  After two consecutive injury-riddled seasons Flinn was released by the Kings. Unable to attract other NHL interest, he was signed by the AHL's San Antonio Rampage for the 2006–07 season.

The Edmonton Oilers signed Flinn to a one-year contract on July 17, 2007. He was then assigned to the Springfield Falcons, playing in 24 games before he was loaned to the Hershey Bears for the remainder of the year.

Flinn signed a one-year contract with the Montreal Canadiens on July 7, 2008. He was assigned to the Canadiens' AHL affiliate, the Hamilton Bulldogs, for the year. In the 2009–10 season, Flinn played two games for the Rockford Icehogs, tallying nine penalty minutes; he was then released but later signed a Professional Try-Out agreement with the IceHogs on November 17, 2009.

Career statistics

References

External links

1980 births
Acadie–Bathurst Titan players
Canadian ice hockey right wingers
Cape Breton Screaming Eagles players
Halifax Mooseheads players
Hamilton Bulldogs (AHL) players
Hershey Bears players
Ice hockey people from Nova Scotia
Laval Titan Collège Français players
Living people
Los Angeles Kings players
Manchester Monarchs (AHL) players
New Jersey Devils draft picks
Reading Royals players
Rockford IceHogs (AHL) players
San Antonio Rampage players
Sportspeople from Halifax, Nova Scotia
Springfield Falcons players